Michas Monroe Ohnstad (born August 14, 1926) is an American former politician in the state of Minnesota. He was born in Hinckley, Minnesota. A social worker, teacher, and clergyman, he attended the Minnesota School of Business, Rutgers University, University of Utah, Texas Christian University, Uppsala University, Augustana College, Western Kentucky University and Lutheran Theological Seminary. Ohnstad is also a veteran of World War II. He served in the House of Representatives for District 19A in 1973 to 1974. He is married with four children.

References

1926 births
Living people
Members of the Minnesota House of Representatives
People from Hinckley, Minnesota
Rutgers University alumni
University of Utah alumni
Texas Christian University alumni
Uppsala University alumni
Western Kentucky University alumni
United States Army personnel of World War II
United States Army soldiers